A constitutional referendum was held in Ecuador on 15 January 1978. Voters were asked whether they wanted a new constitution or a revised version of the existing constitution. The former option was approved by 57% of voters, although around invalid votes accounted for a quarter of those cast, with many cast in protest at not having the option of returning to the 1945 constitution.

Background
Following a military coup in 1972, in 1976 the military government formed three commissions to assist with the transition back to civil rule. One group was to draft a new constitution, one was to revise the 1945 constitution, and one to create laws on political parties, local elections and the referendum.

Results

References

1978
1978 in Ecuador
1978 referendums
Constitutional referendums in Ecuador